"This Is It" is a 1965 single by Jim Reeves. "This Is It" was Reeves' second posthumous single to reach number one on the U.S. country singles chart. The single stayed at the top of the chart for three weeks and spent a total of twenty-two weeks on the chart.  "This Is It" also peaked at number eighteen on the "Easy Listening" charts and number eighty-eight on the Billboard Hot 100.

Chart performance

References

1965 singles
Jim Reeves songs
Songs written by Cindy Walker
Song recordings produced by Chet Atkins
1965 songs
RCA Records singles